Dølen (The Dalesman) is a local Norwegian newspaper published in Vinstra in Oppland county. It is not affiliated with any political party. The newspaper covers events in the central Gudbrand Valley in the municipalities of Ringebu, Sør-Fron, and Nord-Fron. The editorship is based in Vinstra, and the newspaper contains material in both Bokmål and Nynorsk. The newspaper was first published on July 31, 1997, and it is issued once a week, on Tuesdays.

The motto of the newspaper is "For døl og dal" (For dalesman and valley). The paper is a member of the National Association of Local Newspapers and Norwegian Media Businesses' Association, and it had a circulation of 3,839 as of December 31, 2014.

The editor of the newspaper is Bjørn Kjellsson Sletten. Sletten will be replaced by a successor in September 2017.

Circulation
According to the Norwegian Audit Bureau of Circulations and National Association of Local Newspapers, Dølen has had the following annual circulation:
2004: 3,501
2005: 3,561
2006: 3,943
2007: 4,242
2008: 4,325
2009: 4,239
2010: 4,292
2011: 4,190
2012: 4,056
2013: 3,973
2014: 3,839
2015: 3,851
2016: 3,732

References

External links
Dølen home page

Weekly newspapers published in Norway
Norwegian-language newspapers
Mass media in Oppland
Nord-Fron
Newspapers established in 1997
1997 establishments in Norway